Dan Atar (born January 12, 1959) is a clinical cardiologist, researcher and professor. He is head of research at Oslo University Hospital, Div. of Medicine, and a full professor at the Institute of Clinical Sciences of the University of Oslo, Norway. He is Editor-in- Chief of the scientific journal Cardiology.

Early life and education 
Dan Atar was born in Freiburg i.Br, West-Germany, into a family of medical practitioners. His father, Zeev Atar, being an ophthalmologist and mother, Dalia Atar working as a registered nurse. When he was four years old the family relocated to Basel, Switzerland. He graduated in 1985 with an MD from  the medical school at Basel University

Career 
Atar completed his postgraduate training at the State University Hospital (Rigshospitalet) of Copenhagen, Denmark under Stig Haunsø, and the Basel University Hospital in Basel, Switzerland under Felix Burkart. Later relocating to Baltimore, he first joined the team under Robert A. Vogel at the University of Maryland Medical Center at Baltimore, studying QCA (Quantitative Coronary Angiography) and continued at Johns Hopkins University in Baltimore, joining the research group of Eduardo Marbán.

Atar received his associate professorship (Privatdozent) at the University of Basel in 1994, and his first junior faculty position at the Department of Cardiology at the Zürich University Hospital, under Thomas F. Lüscher. He then served as senior cardiologist in Copenhagen, Denmark.

In 2002, he received a call to the University of Oslo, Norway, to assume a full professorship in cardiology at Aker University Hospital in Oslo, where he also was appointed Head of Department. In 2014,  Atar was appointed Head of Research for the Division of Medicine at Oslo University Hospital.

Alongside these positions, Dan Atar engaged in the European Society of Cardiology (ESC). He became Chair of the Working Group of Cardiovascular Pharmacotherapy in 2006 and was later elected to a Councilor position and Board member of the ESC. In 2014–16, he was elected Vice- President of the ESC,  and in  2018, he was elected as Secretary/Treasurer of its executive Board.

He became Editor-in-Chief for the peer-reviewed international journal Cardiology (Karger). He served on numerous Executive Steering Committees for worldwide clinical trials, particularly chairing the FIRE-study (published in 2009), the MITOCARE trial (2015), and the BETAMI trial (2018-).

He served for eight years in the board of the Norwegian Society of Cardiology.

Throughout his career, he has practiced as a senior cardiologist seeing patients both on the ward and in outpatient clinics.

Personal life 
On August 13, 1988, Dan Atar married Anne-Mette Kristensen in Copenhagen, Denmark. They had two children,  Anne-Mette died in 2001. On April 8, 2008, Dan married the opera singer Anna Elisabet Einarsson. They have two children.

Selected publications

Awards and honors 
In 1992, Dan Atar won the first prize in the scientific competition of the ISHR (International Society of Heart Research, European Section).

In 1993, he was awarded the scientific prize of the Danish Society of Internal Medicine. In 1996, he won the Swiss Cardiology Prize awarded from the Swiss Soc. Of Cardiology. In 1996, he was awarded the Foundation Max Cloëtta research award.
In 1998, he won the Andreas Grüntzig Memorial Scholarship for Interventional Cardiology. In 2015, he was awarded the annual Cardiology Prize (Storstein's Prize) by the Norwegian Society of Cardiology.

In 2004, he became a visiting associate professor of medicine at Johns Hopkins University, Baltimore, MD,

He earned a Doctor honoris causa from the Carol Davila University of Medicine and Pharmacy in Bucharest, Romania.

References

Further reading

External links 
https://www.med.uio.no/klinmed/english/people/aca/danat/index.html
https://khrono.no/25-forskere-fra-norske-institusjoner-pa-lista-over-verdens-mest-siterte/421271
https://www.uniforum.uio.no/nyheter/2016/11/han-er-ein-av-noregs-12-mest-siterte-i-verda.html
https://www.helse-sorost.no/nyheter/den-hjertegode-professor
https://www.ous-research.no/home/atar/Group+members/12009
 Interview – the MITOCARE study presentation at ESC: https://www.youtube.com/watch?v=nzFxCHRJyCQ&index=119&list=PLN5RC1OF9yB4q-ss_gGa0ZkvG5MTI3b80&app=desktop

 
https://www.forskerforum.no/atte-uio-forskere-blant-verdens-mest-siterte/ 
 
https://khrono.no/20-forskere-ved-norske-institusjoner-pa-listen-over-verdens-mest-siterte/533453 

1959 births
Living people
Physicians from Freiburg im Breisgau
Academic staff of the University of Oslo
Academic staff of the University of Basel
Academic staff of the University of Zurich
University of Basel alumni
German cardiologists
Academic journal editors
Fellows of the European Society of Cardiology
Fellows of the American College of Cardiology
Swiss expatriates in Norway
Swiss expatriates in Denmark
Physicians from Basel-Stadt
German emigrants to Switzerland
Swiss cardiologists
Swiss expatriates in the United States